Billboard China was a Chinese online music magazine founded by Vision Media Group on September 5, 2016. It served as the Chinese version of Billboard, also featuring independent coverage of both Chinese and international music content.

Background 
After entering the Philippines and Thailand markets, Billboard formed another partnership with Chinese media company Vision Media Group in September 2016. The partnership resulted in several music content channels across platforms, including print, online, and mobile. Co-president of Billboard John Amato described: "This expansion into China is a milestone for Billboard." On December 29, 2016, Billboard China's website was officially launched.

On August 8, 2022, Billboard announced their return to Chinese music market, by relaunching their music charts.

Charts
On April 21, 2017, Billboard China partnered with Nielsen-CCData and Sina Weibo to launch the Billboard China Weibo Music Chart. On January 7, 2018, the Billboard China Weibo Music Chart developed into the Billboard China Social Music Chart, and Billboard China announced the launch of the Billboard China Top 100, the Chinese equivalent to the US Billboard Hot 100.

 Billboard China Airplay/FL
 Billboard China Social Music Chart
 Billboard China Top 100

References

External links 
 
 

Billboard (magazine)
Chinese music websites
Online music magazines
2016 establishments in China
Defunct magazines published in China